McAfee  is a surname of Irish and Scottish origin. The name is an Anglicisation of the Gaelic Mac Dhuibhshíthe, meaning "son of Duibhshíth". The personal name, Duibhshíth, was composed of two elements: dubh meaning "black", and síth meaning "peace". The surname has been in Ireland since the seventeenth century. McAfee is less frequently attested than Mahaffy, a name of similar origin.

List of persons with the surname 

 Andrew McAfee, IT researcher
 Annalena McAfee, British writer
 Anndi McAfee (born 1979), American actress and singer
 Charles F. McAfee (born 1932), African American architect, housing activist, and businessman
 Cheryl L. McAfee (born c. 1958), African American architect
 Cleland Boyd McAfee (1866–1944), American theologian and hymn writer
 Fiona Apple McAfee-Maggart (born 1977), American singer-songwriter
 Fred McAfee (born 1968), American professional football player
 George McAfee (1918–2009), American professional football player
 John McAfee (1945–2021), American computer programmer and founder of McAfee, Inc.
 Ken MacAfee (born 1956), American football tight end in the 1970s
 Ken MacAfee (end) (1929–2007), American football end in the 1950s
 Larry McAfee (1955–1995), American figure in the right to die movement
 Mildred H. McAfee (1900–1994), American academic and WAVES (Navy) leader
 Pat McAfee (born 1987), American professional football player and wrestler
 Preston McAfee (born 1956), American economist
 Robert B. McAfee (1784–1849), American politician
 Robert McAfee Brown (1920–2001), American theologian
 Shadrick McAfee (born 1974), American professional football player
 Walter McAfee (1914–1995), American scientist

See also 
 McCaffrey, surname
 McAtee, surname

References 

Surnames